The 1988 British National Track Championships were a series of track cycling competitions held from 29 July – 7 August 1988 at the Leicester Velodrome.

Medal summary

Men's Events

Women's Events

References

1988 in British sport
July 1988 sports events in the United Kingdom
August 1988 sports events in the United Kingdom